Unika De La Salle Manado is a private Catholic higher education institution run by the Institute of the Brothers of the Christian Schools in Manado, North Sulawesi, Indonesia.  it was established by the Christian Brothers in 2000 as a response to the monetary crisis that hit Indonesia in 1997. The Bishop of Manado, Msgr Joseph Suwatan, realized that the crisis hitting Indonesia could be overcome through the establishment of educational institutions. He founded the De La Salle Catholic University Manado in cooperation with the Christian Brothers from the De La Salle University of Manila, Philippines.. It is part of the worldwide network of La Sallian educational institutions.

History 
The Diocese of Manado, Indonesia runs a series of well known and trusted Catholic educational institutions enrolling children from kindergarten to high school. This tradition has proved its ability to produce leaders of nations and communities as well as professionals who have contributed to community development in Indonesia. The contribution of Catholic educational institutions in the general level of Indonesian colleges and high schools, as well as  its role in achieving national goals of intellectual development despite poor and diminished government support has been proved by the latest studies.

As a first attempt to introduce Catholic-run universities in Manado, the Diocese founded in the 1960s IKIP Catholic Budi Dharma which managed to produce graduates (S1) but was later closed. Steps to re-establish Catholic universities began were again begun by the Diocese in 1997, starting with contacts with the De La Salle Brothers in Manila who have years of experience in managing higher education institutions in the Philippines.

Catholic university 
On 7 August 1999, Mgr. J. Suwatan, MSC established the Foundation of Unika De La Salle Manado, with an official letter from Notary R. H. Hardaseputra, SH No. 2 dated 7 August 1999, followed by the Decision Letter of Minister of Education Nr. 123/D/O/2000 (7 August). Father Agus Mangundap, MA was appointed chairman of the foundation. He and other trustee agencies managed the documents and files to be submitted to the Office of Ministry of Education and Culture in Jakarta. In addition, they also coordinated with the provincial of De La Salle Brothers to establish the university, until a memorandum of understanding (MOU) was signed with the provincial of De La Salle Brothers Philippines. Based on the MOU, the Foundation of De La Salle Manado was established by Bishop of Manado Mgr. Josef Suwatan, MSC and Provincial of La Salle Brothers Philippines Brother Armin Luistro, FSC.

After a permit from the Indonesian Government and a lot of improvements, the number of prospective college students of Unika De La Salle Manado drastically increased, a trend that has been continuing until now. In 2009, Father Revi R. H. M. Tanod, SS, SE, MA was appointed Rector for the term of 2009-2013 after passing the selection mechanism.

De La Salle Brothers 
The university is named after Saint John Baptist De La Salle, who was the founder of the religious congregation of the Lasallian Brothers formally known as the Brothers of the Christian School (Fratres Scholarum Christianarum, abbreviated FSC). This religious congregation, founded in Rheims, France in 1680 is exclusively dedicated to education.

Recent years
Comprehensive and sustainable reformation inside the university have resulted in an increase of  confidence from stakeholders, as well as an increasing number of prospective students and the good reputation of its first alumni on the job market.

Kombos's  campus stands around a four-level building (91 x 18 meters) composed of classrooms and administration facilities. The increasing number and diversity of origin of the university's students reflect the rapid development of Unika De La Salle-Manado. In 2007, from 1,077 active students of Unika De La Salle Manado, approximately 20% came from outside the region such as Pontianak, Balikpapan, Samarinda, Jogjakarta, Jakarta, Papua, Ambon and Ternate.

In 2009, only a decade after its foundation, the number of students in the university reached 1,183 distributed among the five faculties (Engineering, Nursing, Agriculture, Economics, and Law). This year saw the Faculty of Mathematics and Natural Sciences (MIPA) merging with the Faculty of Engineering. Likewise, human resources along with infrastructure and facilities constantly improved both qualitatively and quantitatively. Each year, about 150-200 students graduate from the university.

Academics

Faculties 
The structure of Unika De La Salle is organized into seven faculties as follows:
 Engineering Faculty (Electrical, Informatics, Industrial, and Civil)
 Economics (Management and Accounting)
 Nursing
 Law
 Agribusiness
 Hospitality and Tourism
 Education

Supporting units 
The university includes the following support units/services:
 the English Department
 the IT Center
 Research and Community Service
 Cooperation and Development
 the Natural Science Laboratory
 the Library
 the Language Lab

Motto 
The motto of Unika De La Salle Manado is 'Religio, Mores, Cultura' (Religion, Morals, Culture), reflecting the university's vocation to educate young people to believe in and rely on God, endorse and promote moral values, while respecting, exploring and promoting the world's present and past culture.

International and national cooperation 
While continuously improving the training and recruitment of its Indonesian lecturers, Unika De La Salle Manado also develops links with national and international institutions, both academic and non-academic. Cooperation with the Lasallian Schools Supervision Services Association, Inc. (LASSSAI) was formalized with the signing of a memorandum of agreement with the diocese in 2009.

Intense and long-term cooperation has been developed between Unika De La Salle-Manado with the Asia Pacific Regional Conference (PARC) of the Lasallian Brothers, based in Singapore. The latter, through an agreement with the international cooperation NGO Fidesco (Paris, France) regularly sends dedicated lecturers.

At the national level, Unika De La Salle Manado is an active member of the Association of Indonesian Catholic University (APTIK) and the Association of Private Higher Education (APTISI) of North Sulawesi province. Unika De La Salle Manado established cooperation agreements with the Institut Teknologi Bandung, Manado State University, University of Sam Ratulangi, and the University of Merdeka Malang (Unmer). In addition, cooperation agreements for the benefit of professional education has been established with several private hospitals in the national and local levels.

Campus 
At its beginning, Unika De La Salle-Manado occupied a small campus in the center of Manado, Kanaka. It lasted until September 2002. The new campus is behind Wenang Permai II Residents Complex, Kairagi I. It was officially opened by the Bishop of Manado, Mgr. Josef Suwatan, and the Governor of North Sulawesi, Drs. A. J. Sondakh, on November 30, 2002.

References

Lasallian colleges and universities
Catholic universities and colleges in Indonesia
Universities in North Sulawesi
Private universities and colleges in Indonesia